Edward Noel may refer to:

Edward Noel, 1st Earl of Gainsborough (1641–1689), British peer and member of the House of Lords
Edward Noel, 2nd Viscount Campden, member of parliament for Rutland
Edward Noel (Indian Army officer) (1886–1974), British officer, diplomat and spy
Edward Noel, 1st Viscount Wentworth (1715–1774)

See also
Edward Noël Walker, governor of British Ceylon